John ab Edmund (by 1525–1553 or later), of Montgomery, Powys, was a Welsh politician.

Career
John was a Member of Parliament for Montgomery Boroughs October 1553.

References

Year of birth missing
Year of death missing
Members of the Parliament of England (pre-1707) for constituencies in Wales
16th-century Welsh politicians
People from Montgomeryshire
1550s deaths
16th-century births
English MPs 1553 (Mary I)